Blackcap may refer to:

Birds
 Eurasian blackcap, Sylvia atricapilla
 Bush blackcap, Lioptilus nigricapillus, found in southern Africa
 European stonechat, Saxicola rubicola

Other
 Black raspberry, sometimes known as blackcap
 Blackcap, East Sussex, nature reserve at the top of the South Downs, England
 RNAS Stretton (HMS Blackcap), former naval air station in Cheshire, England

See also
 Black Cap (disambiguation)
 Blackcaps (disambiguation)

Animal common name disambiguation pages